Khlong Phra Udom is one of the twelve subdistricts (tambon) of Pak Kret District in Nonthaburi Province, Thailand. It is bounded by (clockwise from the north) Khlong Khoi, Bang Tanai, Ko Kret and Bang Phlap subdistricts. In 2020 its population was 6,648.

Administration

Central administration
The subdistrict is subdivided into 6 administrative villages (muban).

Local administration
The whole area of the subdistrict is covered by Khlong Phra Udom Subdistrict Administrative Organization.

References

External links
Website of Khlong Phra Udom Subdistrict Administrative Organization

Tambon of Nonthaburi province
Populated places in Nonthaburi province